The Island of Danna or Danna, is an inhabited tidal island in Argyll and Bute.

Geography
It is connected to the mainland by a stone causeway and is at the southern end of the narrow Tayvallich peninsula, which separates Loch Sween from the Sound of Jura. It is part of the Ulva, Danna and the MacCormaig Isles SSSI. Danna is part of the Knapdale National Scenic Area, one of 40 in Scotland.

Footnotes

Tidal islands of Scotland
Islands of Argyll and Bute
Islands of the Inner Hebrides